Marinobacterium coralli  is a Gram-negative and aerobic bacterium from the genus of Marinobacterium which has been isolated from the mucus of the coral Mussismilia hispida from the São Sebastião Channel in Brazil. S.I. Paul et al. (2021) isolated, characterized and identified Marinobacterium coralli from marine sponges of the Saint Martin's Island Area of the Bay of Bengal, Bangladesh.

Biochemical characteristics of Marinobacterium coralli 
Colony, morphological, physiological, and biochemical characteristics of Marinobacterium coralli are shown in the Table below.

Note: + = Positive; – =Negative; V =Variable (+/–)

References

External links
Type strain of Marinobacterium coralli at BacDive -  the Bacterial Diversity Metadatabase

 

Alteromonadales
Bacteria described in 2011